Andriy Toroshanko (born May 31, 1998) is a Ukrainian karateka competing in the kumite 84 kg division. He is 2017 and 2018 European Team Championships medalist.

References

External links
 Ukrainian Karate Federation: Andriy Toroshanko

1998 births
Living people
Ukrainian male karateka